Abhilash Thapliyal (born 24 November) is an Indian radio jockey, film actor and TV host. He has been associated with a few Indian and global radio stations, as well as a few television channels as a voice actor. After being a part of Red FM, Abhilash took a break as a Radio Jockey, and appeared in Aleya Sen Sharma's directorial debut film, Dil Juunglee, alongside Taapsee Pannu and Saqib Saleem.

Early life
Thapliyal belongs to Pauri Garhwal in Uttrakhand. His father was a retired Army officer and his mother is a homemaker. Abhilash has done his schooling from Army Public School & Kendriya Vidyalaya, and has graduated in journalism and mass communication from Delhi University.

Career
Abhilash started his career when he was an undergraduate student in Delhi University. He has also worked with 94.3 Radio One, Fever 104 FM, and 93.5 Red FM. Abhilash has also lent his voice to different TV channels such as, Bindass, National Geographic, Fox History, Hungama, and Cartoon Network etc. Abhilash promoted a fundraising campaign for Sudhir Kumar Chaudhary, an ardent Sachin Tendulkar fan, and sponsored his travel tickets to the Champions Trophy 2017. This earned him a congratulatory call from Sachin Tendulkar. Abhilash has also made an appearance on The Kapil Sharma Show.

Abhilash made his TV debut as a host in 2014, with the World Kabaddi League. He went on to become the in-stadium host for both the Formula1 (2013), and the host for the cricket team Delhi Daredevils (IPL 2013, 2014,2015). He has hosted the red carpet for GiMA (2016). Abhilash is also the first Radio Jockey in India to do live video prank calls on Facebook. Abhilash has been the mascot for the Get Healthy Campaign for Nestle, Hindustan Times for the college and Corporate Cup of Delhi Daredevils (IPL). He has also been the face of Hindustan Times's 'Campus ka Mahayudh'

Abhilash made his Bollywood debut in 2018 with Dil Juunglee in a well-received performance starring alongside Taapsee Pannu, and Saqib Saleem. Abhilash has also featured in Google Maps TVC and became the face of Hot star's Indian Premier League campaign 'Duggal' in 2018.

Filmography

Radio

Television

Acting credits

Awards

References

Living people
Indian male film actors
Male actors in Hindi cinema
21st-century Indian male actors
Indian male voice actors
Indian VJs (media personalities)
Indian male television actors
Indian television presenters
Indian radio presenters
Year of birth missing (living people)